Abşeron FK is an Azerbaijani football club. The club plays in the AFFA Amateur League.

History 
Founded in 2010, the club immediately gained admittance to the Azerbaijan First Division in 2010.
In April 2011 the team secured their promotion to Azerbaijan Premier League after clinching First division's champion title. Absheron had an unbeaten run in the first division and broke new records for a club with most points in the first division and most victories in a season.

On 1 July 2011, Absheron FC announced that due to sponsorship problems the club would cease to exist, with their place in the Premier League being taken by Sumgayit City F.C.

Absheron FC resumed its activities on November 29, 2017.

Honours 
 AFFA Amateur League
 Winners (1) : 2017–18

League and domestic cup history

Managers

References

External links 
 Official website

Absheron
Association football clubs established in 2010
Defunct football clubs in Azerbaijan
Association football clubs disestablished in 2011
2010 establishments in Azerbaijan
2011 disestablishments in Azerbaijan